Stenolophina is a subtribe of ground beetles in the family Carabidae. There are about 9 genera and at least 50 described species in Stenolophina.

Genera
These nine genera belong to the subtribe Stenolophina:
 Acupalpus Latreille, 1829 i c g b
 Agonoleptus Casey, 1914 i c g b
 Amerinus Casey, 1884 i c g b
 Bradycellus Erichson, 1837 i c g b
 Dicheirotrichus Jacquelin du Val, 1855 i c g b
 Philodes LeConte, 1861 i c g b
 Pogonodaptus G. Horn, 1881 i c g b
 Polpochila Solier, 1849 i c g b
 Stenolophus Dejean, 1821 i c g b (seedcorn beetles)
Data sources: i = ITIS, c = Catalogue of Life, g = GBIF, b = Bugguide.net

References

Further reading

External links

 

Harpalinae